Ebrahimabad (also Romanized as Ebrāhīmābād; also known as Ebrāhīmābād-e Hāshemī) is a village in Eshaqabad Rural District, Zeberkhan District, Nishapur County, Razavi Khorasan Province, Iran. At the 2006 census, its population was 67, in 19 families.

References 

Populated places in Nishapur County